Christopher Alfred Clearihan (born 10 September 1949) is an Australian motor racing driver and Air Race pilot.

Motor racing
Clearihan's first race car was the Canon Bolwell Nagari. It was with this car, previously operated by Terry Spooner, that he showed up at Oran Park, Toby-Lee Series in 1972. With an audience of 20,000 people, Clearihan claimed his first win. He then continued to win production sports car races in the Nagari, establishing a name for himself. Clearihan then bought a Formula Ford open-wheeled Elfin and proceeded to win the TAA Driver to Europe Formula Ford race in rainy conditions at Surfers Paradise.

Clearihan won two Australian Sports Car Championships in 1982, and 1985 (while finishing 2nd in 1984 and 3rd in 1983, 1986 and 1988), in addition to various state titles, the Pie Series and Scratch Races at Amaroo Park in Sydney. Finished in the top 10 in the Bathurst 1000, and eighth in the 1988 Indonesian Grand Prix. He competed consistently between 1986–92. After purchasing the Tony Edmondson Alfa Romeo Alfetta-Chevrolet Sports Sedan, Clearihan spent the next 10 years breaking all lap records.

At the 1984 Castrol 500 touring car race at the Sandown Raceway in Melbourne, Clearihan, who was to have co-driven with David Grose in a Mazda RX-7, was excluded from the meeting after qualifying following an altercation in the pits with Allan Moffat. Moffat (also driving an RX-7) and Clearihan had tangled out on the circuit with a confrontation following in the pits. After Clearihan's exclusion, the 1983 Sports Car Champion Peter Hopwood who was driving in the final round of the 1984 Australian Drivers' Championship at the meeting, was given permission to take his place in the RX-7. Moffat went on to take second place in the 500.

He won the 2008 Wakefield 300.

Aircraft
Developing an interest in aircraft in 1992, Chris Clearihan switched to flying in search of a new challenge. In 1992 and 1994 he won the Twin Engine Pylon Air Race, coming second in 1993 while still racing cars. In 1998 Clearihan won the Around Australia Air Race and continued to win other twin-engine races.

More recently he has worked on developing an airstrip in Michelago, New South Wales.

Career results

Complete World Touring Car Championship results
(key) (Races in bold indicate pole position) (Races in italics indicate fastest lap)

References

External links

1949 births
Living people
World Touring Car Championship drivers
Australian Touring Car Championship drivers
Formula Holden drivers
Formula Ford drivers
Racing drivers from the Australian Capital Territory
Sportspeople from Canberra